Various LGBT themes are present in different in African diasporic mythologies, primary among them being Voodoo.

Haitian Vodou and Louisiana Vodou

A large number of spirits or deities exist in Haitian and Louisiana Voodoo called lwa. These lwa may be regarded as families of individuals or as a singular entity with distinct aspects, with links to particular areas of life.

Some lwa have particular links with magic, ancestor worship or death such as the Gede and Bawon. A number of these are further particularly associated with [Gender variance|gender non-conformity] or same-sex interactions. These include Ghede Nibo, a spirit caring for those who die young. He is sometimes depicted as an effeminate drag queen and inspires those he inhabits to lascivious sexuality of all kinds, especially gender non-conforming or lesbian behaviour in women. Gede Nibo's parents are Baron Samedi and Maman Brigitte; Baron Samedi is the leader of the Gede and Barons and is depicted as a bisexual dandy or occasionally as transgender, wearing a top-hat and frock coat along with a women's skirts and shoes. Samedi has a tendency toward "lascivious movements" that cross gender boundaries and also imply a lust for anal sex.

Other barons displaying gay behaviour are Baron Lundy and Baron Limba, who are lovers and teach a type of homoerotic nude wrestling at their school, believed to increase magical potency. Baron Oua Oua, who often manifests with a childlike aspect, has been called the baron "most closely linked to homosexuality" by Vodou practitioners.

Another lwa, Erzulie, is associated with love, sensuality and beauty. Erzulie can manifest aspects that are LGBT-related, including transgender or amazonian traits, in addition to traditionally feminine guises. When inhabiting men, these aspects can result in gender non-conforming or homoerotic behaviour, whereas they may result in lesbianism or anti-male sentiment in women. Erzulie Freda is seen as the protector of gay men, and Erzulie Dantor is associated with lesbians.

Santería and Candomblé
Santería and Candomblé are syncretic religions derived from Yoruba diasporic beliefs and Catholicism, most prevalent in South Americas, including Cuba and Brazil. Their mythologies have many similarities to that of Yoruba, and contains a pantheon of Orishas (spirits), comparable to (and often identified with) the loa of Voodoo.

In one Cuban Santería "pataki", or mythological story, the sea goddess Yemaha is tricked into incestuous sex with her son Shango. To hide her shame at this event, she banished her other two sons, Inle and Abbata, to live at the bottom of the ocean, additionally cutting out Inle's tongue and making Abbata deaf. As a result of their isolation and loneliness, Inle and Abbata become passionate friends and then lovers, able to communicate emphatically. This pataki is used to explain the origin of incest, muteness, and deafness in addition to homosexuality.

See also

 LGBT themes in mythology
 LGBT topics and Afro-Americans in the Americas
 Queer theology
 Religion and homosexuality
 Religion and transgenderism

References
Specific

General

Further reading
 
 
 

LGBT in Benin
LGBT in Brazil
LGBT in Cuba
LGBT in Haiti

LGBT topics in the African diaspora
LGBT and religion